Chatterley is a surname. Notable people with the surname include:

 Andy Chatterley (born 1973), music producer
 Catherine Chatterley, Canadian historian
 Lew Chatterley (born 1945), English football player and coach
 William Simmonds Chatterley (1787–1822), English actor

See also
 Lady Chatterley
 Chatterley railway station, Staffordshire, England
 "Far, Far, Away on Judea's Plains" (melody name, "Chatterley"), see John Menzies Macfarlane